"White Guilt" is a song by the Los Angeles-based punk rock band The Bronx, released as the third single from their 2006 album The Bronx. Gilby Clarke played additional guitar on the song, having produced the band's previous album The Bronx (2003).

While the album was released by the Island Def Jam Music Group, the singles for all of their albums have been released exclusively in the United Kingdom, through Wichita Recordings. The single was released on both compact disc and 7-inch vinyl, the latter pressed on red vinyl and limited to 1,500 copies. The B-side song, "Rockers NYC", is an outtake from the album's recording sessions. The cover artwork was designed by guitarist Joby J. Ford.

The music video for "White Guilt" was directed by Mike Piscitelli. It depicts the band as "out-of-work superheroes and fictional characters", with singer Matt Caughthran in costume as the Easter Bunny, guitarist Joby Ford as a genie, drummer Jorma Vik as a vampire, and bassist James Tweedy as Santa Claus. The four are destitute and spend their day among the homeless, with Ford busking near the beach by taking photos with tourists and families. He becomes upset when another Santa Claus and Easter Bunny begin busking in the same spot, and calls the others over to attack them. The fight is broken up by the police and the band members are arrested.

Track listing

CD version

Vinyl version

Personnel

Band
 Matt Caughthran – lead vocals
 Joby J. Ford – guitar, backing vocals, artwork and design
 James Tweedy – bass guitar, backing vocals
 Jorma Vik – drums

Additional musicians
 Gilby Clarke – guitar

Production
 Michael Beinhorn – producer, recording
 Ross Hogarth – recording
 Nick Paige – recording assistant
 Mike Shipley – mixing engineer
 Brian Wolgemuth – mixing assistant
 Butch Walker – additional vocal production
 Karl Egsieker – engineer

See also
The Bronx discography

References

2006 singles
2006 songs
The Bronx (band) songs
Song recordings produced by Michael Beinhorn